The Crest is the fourteenth album by German speed/power metal guitarist Axel Rudi Pell, and was released in 2010 on Steamhammer/SPV records.

Deluxe edition
On November 22, 2010, a deluxe edition of the Crest was released, which along with new artwork and additional photos and a 24-page booklet, also contains a second disc containing songs performed in the last Axel Rudi Pell DVD One Night Live, as well as an extended version of "Dreaming Dead" which has a longer guitar solo.

Reception

Charts: Austria #68; Sweden #45; Switzerland #38; Germany #22.

Track listing
All songs by Axel Rudi Pell

 "Prelude of Doom" (intro) - 1:32
 "Too Late" - 5:58
 "Devil Zone" - 6:08
 "Prisoner of Love" - 5:56
 "Dreaming Dead" - 7:39
 "Glory Night" - 5:45
 "Dark Waves of the Sea (Oceans of Time Part II: The Dark Side)" - 8:00
 "Burning Rain" - 5:44
 "Noblesse Oblige (Opus #5 Adagio Contabile)" - 4:08
 "The End of Our Time" - 6:15
 "Dreaming Dead (Extended Version)" - 11:06 (Only available in the Deluxe Edition)

Disc 2 of Deluxe Edition:
 "Tear Down the Walls" - 6:27
 "Strong as a Rock" - 8:14
 "Medley: The Masquerade Ball / Casbah / Tales of the Crown" - 14:37
 "Drum Solo" - 4:32
 "Rock the Nation" - 6:10
 "The Temple of the King" - 9:20
 "Mystica" - 9:47
 "Fool Fool / Eternal Prisoner" - 13:33

Personnel
Johnny Gioeli - Vocals
Axel Rudi Pell - Guitar
Volker Krawczak - Bass
Mike Terrana - Drums
Ferdy Doernberg - Keyboards

References

External links

2010 albums
Axel Rudi Pell albums
SPV/Steamhammer albums